Kaman is a fast attack craft in the Southern Fleet of the Islamic Republic of Iran Navy and the lead ship of her class.

Construction and commissioning 
Kaman was built by French Constructions Mécaniques de Normandie at Cherbourg, as one of the first six contracted on 19 February 1974. Her keel was laid down on 5 February 1975 and on 8 January 1976, she was launched. Falakhon was commissioned into the fleet on 12 August 1977.

Service history 
During Iran-Iraq War, her home port was Bushehr Naval Base.

See also 

 List of current ships of the Islamic Republic of Iran Navy
 List of military equipment manufactured in Iran

References 

Missile boats of the Islamic Republic of Iran Navy
Ships built at Shahid Tamjidi shipyard
Ships of the Islamic Republic of Iran Navy
Ships built in Iran
Missile boats of Iran
1976 ships
Ships built in France
Iran–Iraq War naval ships of Iran